Symphony No. 1 The Lord of the Rings is the first symphony for concert band written by Johan de Meij, and one of several works of classical music based on J. R. R. Tolkien's fantasy The Lord of the Rings. It premiered in 1988 with the Groot Harmonieorkest van de Belgische Gidsen conducted by Norbert Nozy. 

In 1989 the symphony won the Sudler Composition Award.

Structure

The symphony consists of five movements, each illustrating a personage or an important episode from the book:

 Gandalf (The Wizard): the theme has the note sequence G-A-D-A-F, "Gandalf" as far as can be formed with the notes A to G. The result is a "striving, rising theme".
 Lothlórien (The Elvenwood)
 Gollum (Sméagol)
 Journey in the Dark
 a. The Mines of Moria
 b. The Bridge of Khazad-Dûm
 Hobbits

Reception 

The CD by the military band  helped give the symphony worldwide acclaim. In 1989 the symphony won the Sudler Composition Award. It has been recorded by several orchestras. An orchestral version of the piece, orchestrated by Henk de Vlieger, was premiered and recorded in 2001 by the London Symphony Orchestra to coincide with the release of the 2001 film, The Fellowship of the Ring. 

The musicologist Estelle Jorgensen wrote that while the symphony has a programmatic aspect, it is "also formally interesting as sheer instrumental sound."

The Tolkien scholar David Bratman wrote in 2010 that the symphony is "so popular" that it has attracted four recordings, "something almost unheard of for a contemporary classical work." He commented that the music, though Dutch, is in the tradition of British concert band and symphonic composers like Malcolm Arnold and Gustav Holst. He stated, too, that like another symphony based on The Lord of the Rings, the Finnish composer Aulis Sallinen's 1996 Symphony No. 7 The Dreams of Gandalf, it mainly aims not to tell the story but to create a mood. Thus, three of the movements introduce characters – Gandalf, Gollum, and (the finale) the Hobbits. The second movement, Bratman wrote, presents the character of a place, the Elvish wood of Lothlorien, "which, like everyone from Bo Hansson to Enya, de Meij seems to hear as steamy." He made an exception for the fourth movement, "Journey in the Dark", which does narrate a story, the dangerous passage through the Mines of Moria.

In celebration of the symphony's 25th anniversary, De Meij conducted the Performance of the piece by the bands of Valparaiso University.

Recordings

 Dutch Royal Military Band conducted by Pierre Kuijpers (Ottavo, 1989)  *The composer served as music advisor for this recording
 The Danish Concert Band conducted by Jørgen Misser Jensen (Copenhagen, 1994)
 Ensemble vents et Percussion de Quebec conducted by Rene' Joly (ATMA, 1997)
The London Symphony Orchestra conducted by David Warble (2001)
 Blaeserphilharmonie Regensburg conducted by Joerg Seggelke (2007)

See also

 Music of Middle-earth
 Music of The Lord of the Rings film series#Symphony (symphony based on music from the Peter Jackson films)

References

1988 compositions
Compositions by Johan de Meij
De Meij
De Meij 1
Music based on The Lord of the Rings